I Hear You Rockin is the title of (at least) two albums.

 The Dave Edmunds Band: I Hear You Rockin'
 Alvin Lee: Ninenteen Ninety-Four released in the United States as I Hear You Rockin'